Sir Hugo Cunliffe-Owen, 1st Baronet (16 August 1870 – 14 December 1947) was an English industrialist.

Childhood
Cunliffe-Owen was born in Kensington, London, the younger son of Sir Philip Cunliffe-Owen, director of the South Kensington Museum. He was educated at Brighton College and then Clifton College.

Career
Cunliffe-Owen articled as a civil engineer with Sir John Wolfe-Barry. He first went into business in Bristol. He became a director of the British-American Tobacco Company on its formation in 1902, later becoming vice-chairman, and chairman from 1923 until his retirement in 1945. For the last two years of his life, he was president of the company.

He was chairman of Cunliffe-Owen Aircraft Ltd until his death in 1947. He was also associated with British and Foreign Aviation Ltd, a company with a nominal capital of £250,000. its stated objects were to acquire not less than 90 per cent of the issued share capital of Olley Air Service Ltd and Air Commerce Ltd and to make agreements between Olley Air Service Ltd, Sir Hugo Cunliffe-Owen, and others to operate air services and aerodromes and manufacture, deal in, and repair aircraft. Associated companies included West Coast Air Services Ltd and Isle of Man Air Services.

Cunliffe-Owen worked for the Ministry of Information during the First World War, and for this he was created a baronet in the 1920 New Year Honours.

Family and private life
Cunliffe-Owen lived at Sunningdale Park in Berkshire. He married Helen Elizabeth Oliver in 1918. They had two sons and two daughters. She died in 1934, and the following year Cunliffe-Owen remarried, to Mauricia Martha Shaw of California. They were legally separated in 1946. His eldest son, Sub-Lieutenant Hugo Leslie Cunliffe-Owen, was killed serving with the Fleet Air Arm aboard the aircraft carrier HMS Indomitable on 12 August 1942, aged 21. His second son, Dudley Herbert, succeeded him in the baronetcy and at Cunliffe-Owen Aircraft.

Cunliffe-Owen was a prominent supporter of Thoroughbred horse racing. He won The Derby with his horse Felstead in 1928, although the best horse he owned was probably the filly Rockfel.

Footnotes

References
Obituary, The Times, 18 December 1947

1870 births
1947 deaths
People educated at Brighton College
People educated at Clifton College
Baronets in the Baronetage of the United Kingdom
English businesspeople
Businesspeople in the tobacco industry
British racehorse owners and breeders
Owners of Epsom Derby winners
Chairmen of British American Tobacco
People from Kensington
English civil engineers
Businesspeople in aviation